Allana is a surname shared by several people:

 Fazila Allana (born 1970), Indian businesswoman
 Ghulam Ali Allana, Pakistani biographer and poet
 Pyar Ali Allana (–2004), Pakistani Shia politician
 Allana Solo, a minor Star Wars character

Indian surnames
Pakistani names
Sindhi-language surnames